Williams Lake Airport or Williams Lake Regional Airport  is located  northeast of Williams Lake, British Columbia, Canada.

Airlines and destinations

See also
Williams Lake Water Aerodrome

References

External links

Certified airports in British Columbia
Cariboo Regional District